OPSA or Opsa may refer to:
Oklahoma Private School Association
Otago Polytechnic Students' Association
OPSA, a branch of the Italian Red Cross that includes some lifeguard duties
Opsa, a dance from Serbia